Pandanales is an order of flowering plants placed in the monocot clade in the Angiosperm Phylogeny Group and Angiosperm Phylogeny Web systems. Within the monocots Pandanales are grouped in the lilioid monocots where they are in a sister group relationship with the Dioscoreales. Historically the order has consisted of a number of different families in different systems but modern classification of the order is based primarily on molecular phylogenetics despite diverse morphology which previously placed many of the families in other groupings based on apparent similarity. Members of the order have a subtropical distribution and includes trees, shrubs, vines, and herbaceous plants. The order consists of 5 families, 36 genera and about 1,610 species.

The anthophytes are a grouping of plant taxa bearing flower-like reproductive structures. They were formerly thought to be a clade comprising plants bearing flower-like structures.  The group contained the angiosperms - the extant flowering plants, such as roses and grasses - as well as the Gnetales and the extinct Bennettitales.

23,420 species of vascular plant have been recorded in South Africa, making it the sixth most species-rich country in the world and the most species-rich country on the African continent. Of these, 153 species are considered to be threatened. Nine biomes have been described in South Africa: Fynbos, Succulent Karoo, desert, Nama Karoo, grassland, savanna, Albany thickets, the Indian Ocean coastal belt, and forests.

The 2018 South African National Biodiversity Institute's National Biodiversity Assessment plant checklist lists 35,130 taxa in the phyla Anthocerotophyta (hornworts (6)), Anthophyta (flowering plants (33534)), Bryophyta (mosses (685)), Cycadophyta (cycads (42)), Lycopodiophyta (Lycophytes(45)), Marchantiophyta (liverworts (376)), Pinophyta (conifers (33)), and Pteridophyta (cryptogams (408)).

One family is represented in the literature. Listed taxa include species, subspecies, varieties, and forms as recorded, some of which have subsequently been allocated to other taxa as synonyms, in which cases the accepted taxon is appended to the listing. Multiple entries under alternative names reflect taxonomic revision over time.

Velloziaceae
 Family: Velloziaceae,

Barbacenia
Genus Barbacenia:
 Barbacenia elegans (Balf.) Pax, accepted as Xerophyta elegans (Balf.) Baker 
 Barbacenia equisetoides (Baker) R.E.Fr. accepted as Xerophyta equisetoides Baker 
 Barbacenia humilis (Baker) Pax ex Burtt Davy & R.Pott, accepted as Xerophyta humilis (Baker) T.Durand & Schinz 
 Barbacenia minuta (Baker) Dinter, accepted as Xerophyta humilis (Baker) T.Durand & Schinz 
 Barbacenia retinervis (Baker) Pax ex Burtt Davy & R.Pott, accepted as Xerophyta retinervis Baker var. retinervis 
 Barbacenia rosea (Baker) Pax ex Burtt Davy & R.Pott, accepted as Xerophyta rosea (Baker) N.L.Menezes 
 Barbacenia schlechteri (Baker) Burtt Davy & R.Pott, accepted as Xerophyta schlechteri (Baker) N.L.Menezes 
 Barbacenia villosa (Baker) Pax ex Burtt Davy & R.Pott, accepted as Xerophyta villosa (Baker) L.B.Sm. & Ayensu [1], indigenous
 Barbacenia viscosa (Baker) Pax ex Burtt Davy & R.Pott, accepted as Xerophyta viscosa Baker 
 Barbacenia wentzeliana Harms, accepted as Xerophyta wentzeliana (Harms) Solch var. wentzeliana 
 Barbacenia wentzeliana Harms var. rhodesiana R.E.Fr. accepted as Xerophyta wentzeliana (Harms) Solch var. wentzeliana

Talbotia
Genus Talbotia:
 Talbotia elegans Balf. accepted as Xerophyta elegans (Balf.) Baker, endemic

Vellozia
Genus Vellozia:
 Vellozia clavata (Baker) Baker, accepted as Xerophyta retinervis Baker var. retinervis 
 Vellozia elegans (Balf.) Oliv. ex Hook.f. accepted as Xerophyta elegans (Balf.) Baker 
 Vellozia elegans (Balf.) Oliv. ex Hook.f. var. minor Baker, accepted as Xerophyta elegans (Balf.) Baker, indigenous
 Vellozia equisetoides (Baker) Baker, accepted as Xerophyta equisetoides Baker, indigenous
 Vellozia humilis Baker, accepted as Xerophyta humilis (Baker) T.Durand & Schinz 
 Vellozia minuta Baker, accepted as Xerophyta humilis (Baker) T.Durand & Schinz 
 Vellozia retinervis (Baker) Baker, accepted as Xerophyta retinervis Baker var. retinervis 
 Vellozia rosea Baker, accepted as Xerophyta rosea (Baker) N.L.Menezes 
 Vellozia schlechteri Baker, accepted as Xerophyta schlechteri (Baker) N.L.Menezes 
 Vellozia suaveolens Greves, accepted as Xerophyta suaveolens (Greves) N.L.Menezes var. suaveolens 
 Vellozia talbotii Balf. accepted as Xerophyta elegans (Balf.) Baker 
 Vellozia villosa Baker, accepted as Xerophyta villosa (Baker) L.B.Sm. & Ayensu [1], indigenous
 Vellozia viscosa (Baker) Baker, accepted as Xerophyta viscosa Baker 
 Vellozia wentzeliana (Harms) Greves, accepted as Xerophyta wentzeliana (Harms) Solch var. wentzeliana

Xerophyta
Genus Xerophyta:
 Xerophyta adendorffii Behnke, endemic
 Xerophyta bakeri T.Durand & Schinz, accepted as Xerophyta villosa (Baker) L.B.Sm. & Ayensu [1] 
 Xerophyta clavata Baker, accepted as Xerophyta retinervis Baker var. retinervis, indigenous
 Xerophyta elegans (Balf.) Baker, endemic
 Xerophyta equisetoides Baker, indigenous
 Xerophyta equisetoides Baker var. pauciramosa L.B.Sm. & Ayensu, accepted as Xerophyta pauciramosa (L.B.Sm. & Ayensu) Behnke, indigenous
 Xerophyta equisetoides Baker var. pubescens L.B.Sm. & Ayensu, accepted as Xerophyta wentzeliana (Harms) Solch var. wentzeliana 
 Xerophyta equisetoides Baker var. setosa L.B.Sm. & Ayensu, accepted as Xerophyta equisetoides Baker 
 Xerophyta humilis (Baker) T.Durand & Schinz, indigenous
 Xerophyta junodii Behnke, endemic
 Xerophyta longicaulis Hilliard, endemic
 Xerophyta melleri Baker, accepted as Xerophyta equisetoides Baker 
 Xerophyta miniata T.Durand & Schinz, accepted as Xerophyta elegans (Balf.) Baker 
 Xerophyta minuta Baker, accepted as Xerophyta elegans (Balf.) Baker 
 Xerophyta mollissima Schinz, accepted as Xerophyta villosa (Baker) L.B.Sm. & Ayensu [1] 
 Xerophyta pauciramosa (L.B.Sm. & Ayensu) Behnke, indigenous
 Xerophyta purpurascens Behnke, endemic
 Xerophyta rehmannii Behnke, endemic
 Xerophyta retinervis Baker, indigenous
 Xerophyta retinervis Baker var. equisetoides (Baker) Coetzee, accepted as Xerophyta equisetoides Baker 
 Xerophyta retinervis Baker var. multiramosa Behnke, endemic
 Xerophyta retinervis Baker var. retinervis, indigenous
 Xerophyta retinervis Baker var. wentzeliana (Harms) Coetzee, accepted as Xerophyta wentzeliana (Harms) Solch var. wentzeliana 
 Xerophyta rosea (Baker) N.L.Menezes, endemic
 Xerophyta schlechteri (Baker) N.L.Menezes, indigenous
 Xerophyta suaveolens (Greves) N.L.Menezes, indigenous
 Xerophyta suaveolens (Greves) N.L.Menezes var. suaveolens, indigenous
 Xerophyta vallispongolana J.E.Burrows, S.M.Burrows & Behnke, endemic
 Xerophyta villosa (Baker) L.B.Sm. & Ayensu, indigenous
 Xerophyta viscosa Baker, indigenous

References

South African plant biodiversity lists
Pandanales